Jinhu County is under the administration of Huai'an, Jiangsu province, China. It occupies the northwestern shores of and extends into Gaoyou Lake, bordering the prefecture-level cities of Yangzhou to the south and east, and Chuzhou (Anhui) to the southwest.

History 
Jinhu County was formerly administered by Baoying and Gaoyou counties until 1959, when it became its own county.

Administrative divisions
Jinhu County has 11 towns. 
11 towns

Climate

References 

County-level divisions of Jiangsu
Huai'an